The Pacific Subtropical Islands is an interim Australian bioregion which includes Norfolk Island and Lord Howe Island (both part of New South Wales). Its IBRA code is PSI.

Subregions

See also

Geography of Australia

References

Further reading
 Thackway, R and I D Cresswell (1995) An interim biogeographic regionalisation for Australia : a framework for setting priorities in the National Reserves System Cooperative Program Version 4.0 Canberra : Australian Nature Conservation Agency, Reserve Systems Unit, 1995. 

Floristic regions
Biota of New South Wales
Floristic provinces
Biogeography of New South Wales
IBRA regions